Simhachalam railway station (station code:SCM), located in the Indian state of Andhra Pradesh, serves Simhachalam in Visakhapatnam district. It lies on the Howrah–Chennai main line.

History

Simhachalam railway station is third busiest railway station in Visakhapatnam after Visakhapatnam railway station and Duvvada railway station. It mainly serves purpose to reach Simhachalam and the surrounding locale.

Between 1893 and 1896,  of the South Eastern Railway was opened for traffic. In 1898–99, Bengal Nagpur Railway was linked to the lines in southern India.

Transportation 
Simhachalam railway station is well connected to all over Visakhapatnam.
 BUSSES TO SIMHACHALAM: (28H,28,28Z/H,6A/H,55H,540,549,6H)
 BUSSES TO KOTTAVALASA: (55K,28K)
 BUSSES TO VIZAG RTC COMPLEX (BUS STATION): (6A/H,28H,12D,300C,28K,28A,28Z/H,333,555)

See also
Waltair railway division

References

External links
Departures from SCM/Simhachalam (2 PFs) India Rail Info

Railway stations in Visakhapatnam
Waltair railway division